The 2022 season is Rosenborg's 43rd consecutive year in the top flight now known as Eliteserien, their 54th season in the top flight of Norwegian football. They will participate in Eliteserien and the Cup. This will be Kjetil Rekdal's first season as Rosenborg manager.

Squad

Transfers

Winter

In:

Out:

Summer

In:

Out:

Friendlies

Competitions

Eliteserien

Results summary

Results by round

Results

Table

Norwegian Cup

Squad statistics

Appearances and goals

|-
|colspan="14"|Players away from Rosenborg on loan:
|-

|-
|colspan="14"|Players who appeared for Rosenborg no longer at the club:
|-

|}

Disciplinary record

See also
Rosenborg BK seasons

References 

2022
Rosenborg